Sit Down and Listen to Hooverphonic, also known as Sit Down and Listen To, is an album by Belgian band Hooverphonic. It was recorded live with an orchestra, but without any audience and was released in 2003.  The only single released from this album is "The Last Thing I Need Is You".

Track listing
 "Antarctica" – 4:50
 "One" – 3:23
 "Inhaler" – 5:57
 "Jackie Cane" – 5:11
 "My Autumn's Done Come" – 4:21
 "2 Wicky" – 4:43
 "Frosted Flake Wood" – 2:58
 "Eden" – 3:40
 "Vinegar & Salt" – 3:47
 "Sad Song" – 3:24
 "Someone" – 5:54
 "The World Is Mine" – 2:33
 "Sometimes" – 4:00
 "The Last Thing I Need Is You" – 3:16

Charts

Weekly charts

Year-end charts

Certifications

References

Hooverphonic albums
2003 live albums